Robert "Roy" Faulkner (born 5 August 1897) was a footballer who earned three caps for the Canadian national side between 1925 and 1926, scoring one goal.

Born in Paisley, Scotland, Faulkner played club football for Glasgow junior teams St Anthony's and Maryhill, in England for Blackburn Rovers, Queens Park Rangers and South Shields, in Canada for Toronto Clarkes and Toronto Ulster United, and in the American Soccer League with Philadelphia and Providence.

References

External links
 

1897 births
American Soccer League (1921–1933) players
Blackburn Rovers F.C. players
Canada men's international soccer players
Canadian soccer players
Expatriate soccer players in Canada
Expatriate soccer players in the United States
Philadelphia Field Club players
Providence Gold Bug players
Footballers from Paisley, Renfrewshire
Queens Park Rangers F.C. players
Scottish expatriate footballers
Scottish expatriate sportspeople in the United States
Canadian expatriate sportspeople in the United States
Scottish emigrants to Canada
Year of death unknown
English Football League players
Scottish footballers
Maryhill F.C. players
Association football wingers
Canadian expatriate soccer players
Toronto Ulster United players
Canadian National Soccer League players
St Anthony's F.C. players
Scottish Junior Football Association players